Charris Rozemalen (born 16 April 1991) is a Dutch female handballer for SG BBM Bietigheim and the Dutch national team.

Achievements
Dutch Division:
Winner: 2017
Dutch Cup:
Winner: 2016
Dutch Supercup:
Winner: 2009, 2016
EHF Youth European Championship:
Bronze Medalist: 2007

References

1991 births
Living people
Sportspeople from Utrecht (city)
Dutch female handball players
Expatriate handball players
Dutch expatriate sportspeople in Spain
Dutch expatriate sportspeople in Norway
Dutch expatriate sportspeople in Germany